Ruder Finn is a public relations firm with headquarters in the United States and China. It is a large privately owned communications agency, serving corporations, governments, and non-profits. It also has offices in San Francisco, London, Washington, D.C., Singapore, and several Indian metro areas including the National Capital Region.

History
Ruder Finn was established in 1948 in New York by David Finn and Bill Ruder. 

The firms's first client was country singer Perry Como; its success at promoting Como attracted more clients in show business, including Dinah Shore and Jack Lemmon. Ruder Finn eventually expanded to represent consumer product companies and government agencies.

In the 1960s through late 1990s, while representing long-time client Philip Morris (now Altria), Ruder Finn was instrumental in crafting the public relations campaign that disputed the evidence tobacco smoking is hazardous to health.

In 1997, Ruder Finn ran the Global Climate Coalition, a group of mainly United States businesses opposing action to reduce greenhouse gas emissions.
	
In 1998, the firm was caught in a conflict of interest after it was revealed that it represented both the Jewish Agency for Israel and the government of Switzerland. The Jewish Agency's World Jewish Restitution Organization was pursuing a settlement with the Swiss government over its financial dealings during World War II. Ruder Finn responded to this news by severing relations with the Jewish Agency.

In 1999 Ruder Finn established RFI Studios, a digital practice, to help clients protect and build their reputation online. The agency expanded in Asia, establishing offices in Shanghai, Beijing, Hong Kong, Guangzhou, Singapore, Delhi, Mumbai and Bangalore.

In 2005, pro bono work done for the UN raised speculation when Kofi Annan's nephew, Kobina, worked as an intern at the firm.

Kathy Bloomgarden, Finn's daughter, became CEO when he retired in 2011. That year Ruder Finn acquired Thunder Communications, a Chinese event management, brand and marketing consultancy, and formed a partnership with Kyodo Public Relations.

In 2012, Ruder Finn accepted a controversial contract from the government of Maldives that was condemned by the Commonwealth of Nations for organizing a political coup d'état that led to the fall of the first democratically elected President of the Maldives. Vice-president of Ruder Finn Tchividjian "admitted there were 'diverse points of views' surrounding the circumstances around the change of government" The Commonwealth Ministerial Action Group reiterated its call for early elections to be held in the Maldives.

The agency has won the PRSA Bronze Anvils, Big Apple Awards, SABREs and PRWeek Awards. David Finn received a Big Apple Award.

In 2015, Ruder Finn acquired the Japanese business of Kyodo Public Relations, one of the largest independent PR firms in Japan and the first PR agency to be listed on JASDAQ Securities Exchange.

In June 2020, Saudi Crown Prince Mohammed bin Salman's Neom city project signed a $1.7 million contract with Ruder Finn to counter criticism and controversies surrounding the project and its founder, such as mass arrests, the assassination of Jamal Khashoggi, and conflict over forced evictions on Howeitat tribal land.

In July 2020, Ruder Finn acquired the video content studio Osmosis Films, headquartered in Brooklyn, New York.

In 2021, Ruder Finn was ranked 30th on the Global Top 250 PR Agency Ranking.

References

External links
 Ruder Finn website
 https://theintercept.com/2019/11/14/peter-handke-nobel-prize-bosnian-genocide-conspiracy/

Public relations companies of the United States
Reputation management companies
Consulting firms established in 1948
1948 establishments in New York City